Birjand Castle is a castle in Birjand, and is one of the attractions of Birjand County. This castle was built by the Safavid dynasty-Qajar dynasty.

Sources 

Castles in Iran

Qajar castles